Y. Visweswara Reddy is politician and a member for YSR Congress Party (Yuvajana Shramika Rythu Congress Party) from Andhra Pradesh state of India. He was elected as a member of the Andhra Pradesh Legislative Assembly  in the 2014 election from the Uravakonda constituency with a margin of less than 5000 votes. He had lost the same seat in the 2004 elections against Payyavula Keshav of Telugu Desam Party (TDP) while he was the member of Communist Party of India (Marxist) (CPI(M)) then.

References

Living people
YSR Congress Party politicians
Communist Party of India (Marxist) politicians from Andhra Pradesh
Members of the Andhra Pradesh Legislative Assembly
People from Anantapur district
Telugu politicians
Year of birth missing (living people)